George Stratton may refer to:

 George Stratton (politician) (c. 1734–1800), East India Company official and politician 
 George Frederick Stratton (1779–c. 1834), English landowner and Fellow of the Royal Society
 George M. Stratton (1865–1957), psychologist
 George Stratton (1897–1954), violinist